The Employment Act 2002 (c 22) is a UK Act of Parliament, which made a series of amendments to existing UK labour law.

Contents
The Employment Act 2002 contained new rules on maternity, paternity and adoption leave and pay, and changes to the tribunal system in the United Kingdom.

Paternity leave is when a male counterpart is able to have time off to spend with the child and the mother while receiving paid leave. 
Maternity leave is one which is included with the leave a mother should get when she has given birth to a child. In the UK a pula would get 26 weeks of paid leave for time they will need to spend with their child. 

Also, under this Act, there were many other factors such as equal pay, fixed-term work, flexible working. 

The Act introduced a mandatory minimum dismissal procedure for employees. After complaints from unions and employers alike that it was merely encouraging a "tick-box" culture, it was repealed in the Employment Act 2008.

External links
 

United Kingdom labour law
United Kingdom Acts of Parliament 2002
2002 in labor relations